The Huntington Village Historic District encompasses the historic village center of Huntington, Massachusetts, USA. The village lies on the west branch of the Westfield River, at the junction of US Route 20 (Russell Road) and Massachusetts Route 112 (East Main Street and Bridge Road). The district was listed on the National Register of Historic Places in 1999.  The village is the most densely populated part of Huntington, and has been its commercial and civic heart since the early 19th century.  It has been divided by the river because its unifying feature, a location where bridges stood since 1810, no longer has one, and the modern replacement bridge built after a 1938 flood just south of the center, does not readily combine the developed areas on either side.

Most of the district was built up between the middle 19th and middle 20th centuries. The area was home to several textile mills, powered by the Westfield River, but none of which have survived.  Most of the district's contributing properties are therefore residential, commercial, and civic, and represent a diversity of architectural styles predominantly from the mid to late 19th century. The district includes properties along the two main roads, as well as Upper Russell, Basket, Laurel, Pleasant, and Park Streets. Of particular architectural note are a concentration of Greek Revival houses characterized by their temple fronts, found in the western part of the village, and Stanton Hall, a fine Italianate structure built as a church, but now owned by the town.

See also
National Register of Historic Places listings in Hampshire County, Massachusetts

References

Historic districts in Hampshire County, Massachusetts
National Register of Historic Places in Hampshire County, Massachusetts
Historic districts on the National Register of Historic Places in Massachusetts